Rob Ellis is a radio presenter. He presents The Rob Ellis Show on Capital FM across Manchester every weekday between 4pm and 7pm. Rob works alongside his small team which consists of Nigel 'Wingman' Clucas and Rachel 'Text on Legs' Burke-Davies. Ellis formerly presented the breakfast show on Capital Manchester (Galaxy FM until 2011) between 2007 and 2019.

Life and career 

Ellis worked as a DJ in Preston, before starting his radio career in 1996 as a producer for shows on Red Rose 999 before progressing to their flagship FM station Rock FM. He later moved on to Manchester's Key 103 to present the station's evening show. Ellis was then later released by Key 103.

In 2006, Ellis joined Galaxy Manchester, and within the first year he was moved to the station's Drive Time show where he was first joined by his co-presenter and then producer Wingman.

In March 2014, Ellis married his fiancée Lisa.

Capital Breakfast with The Rob Ellis Show (2007–2019) 

In June 2007, Ellis took over the Galaxy 102 breakfast show from Wes Butters, presenting his first broadcast on Monday 18 June 2007. He was rejoined by Wingman and for the first time, co-presented the show with Rachel Burke-Davies and comedian 'Stand Up' Alex Boardman, an original co-presenter of Wes Butters' show.

In April 2008, The Rob Ellis Show was nominated for the Sony Radio Awards 'Rising Star' award (won by George Lamb), alongside Kelly Osbourne and others. In the same year, Boardman left the show to focus on other projects, with Wingman stepping in as Boardman's replacement and joining Burke-Davies as a permanent co-presenter on The Rob Ellis Show.

In January 2011, amidst the rebranding of multiple Galaxy stations to the Capital network, Ellis continued as host of the breakfast show when the station re-branded as Capital Manchester. The show was renamed to Capital Breakfast with Rob Ellis to align with the main format of the Capital network.

The Rob Ellis Show (2019–Present) 
On 8 April 2019, Capital Manchester merged with 2BR to form Capital Manchester and Lancashire. The local breakfast show was replaced by a network broadcast from London (Capital Breakfast with Roman Kemp), and Ellis and his team began presenting the weekday drivetime show. (4pm-7pm)

References

External links
 Rob Ellis at Capital FM
 Rising Star Award

British radio DJs
Capital (radio network)
Musicians from Preston, Lancashire
Living people
Year of birth missing (living people)